Andrea Scherney is a Paralympic athlete from Austria competing the F44 classification for single below-knee amputees.

Career
Scherney has competed in four Paralympic Games, starting in 1996 in Atlanta, United States continuing through 2000 in Sydney, Australia and 2004 in Athens, Greece as well as the 2008 Summer Paralympics in Beijing China.  She has competed in various events at each and has always won at least one medal, gold in the javelin for F42-44/46 in 1996, long jump for F44/46 in 2004 and for F44 in 2008 and silvers in both the F44 shot put and javelin in 2000.

She holds the world record in the P44 pentathlon, an event combining long jump, shot put, 100m sprint, discus and 400m run.

Private
Werner Groiß, an Austrian politician, is one of her cousin's.

References

External links
 

1966 births
Living people
Paralympic athletes of Austria
Athletes (track and field) at the 1996 Summer Paralympics
Athletes (track and field) at the 2000 Summer Paralympics
Athletes (track and field) at the 2004 Summer Paralympics
Athletes (track and field) at the 2008 Summer Paralympics
Paralympic gold medalists for Austria
Paralympic silver medalists for Austria
World record holders in Paralympic athletics
Medalists at the 1996 Summer Paralympics
Medalists at the 2000 Summer Paralympics
Medalists at the 2004 Summer Paralympics
Medalists at the 2008 Summer Paralympics
Paralympic medalists in athletics (track and field)
Austrian female long jumpers
Austrian female javelin throwers
Austrian female shot putters
Long jumpers with limb difference
Javelin throwers with limb difference
Shot putters with limb difference
Paralympic long jumpers
Paralympic javelin throwers
Paralympic shot putters